Gopi Shankar Madurai, born 13 April 1991, is an Indian equal rights and Indigenous rights activist. Shankar was one of the youngest, and the first openly intersex and genderqueer statutory authority and one of the candidates to contest in 2016 Tamil Nadu Legislative Assembly election. Shankar is also the founder of Srishti Madurai Student Volunteer Collective. Shankar's work inspired the Madras High Court (Madurai Bench) to direct the Government of Tamil Nadu to order a ban on forced sex-selective surgeries on intersex infants. In December 2017 Shankar was elected to the executive board of ILGA Asia. In August 2020 the Ministry of Social Justice and Empowerment appointed Shankar as the South Regional representative in the National Council for Transgender Persons.

Early life
Shankar was born as Sarvapunya in Sellur slum at Madurai, Tamil Nadu. At the age of fourteen, Shankar started volunteering Ramakrishna Mission. Later Shankar was accepted as a probationer for being a monk at Ramakrishna Math. In 2005, Shankar was given spiritual initiation under the spiritual lineage of Swami Vivekananda by Swami Gitanandaji (Former Vice-president of Ramakrishna Math and Mission) who is also a disciple of Swami Virajananda. During Shankar's tenure in Ramakrishna Math, Shankar served as the assistant to the editor of Sri Ramakrishna Vijayam Magazine. 

In April 2010 Shankar left Ramakrishna Math to pursue Religion, Philosophy, and Sociology studies at The American College in Madurai (affiliated to Madurai Kamaraj University). Gopi is a student of Yoga for more than 15 years and served as Yoga Instructor for 5 years. Shankar taught Yoga for free to more than 5000 children and Indian Philosophy class for many westerners including Tony MacMahon of Ireland. Shankar partly freelanced the New Horizon Media Pvt Ltd (Tamil Publications). Shankar was awarded a Leadership Degree "Leading Change" exclusively for The Queen's Young Leaders from the University of Cambridge in 2017.

Social activism
Shankar is founder of Srishti Madurai Volunteer Movement one of the first inclusive non-funded pro bono group of its kind which has involved academicians, Independent scholars, human rights activist, environmentalists, animal rights activists and LGBTQIA, genderqueer activists aiming to protect the Indigenous traditions. In October 2011 Shankar launched India's first helpline for genderqueer, LGBTQIA people at Madurai. Later in June 2013 the helpline turned to offer service for 24 hours with a tagline Just having someone understanding to talk to can save a life. Shankar also organized Asia's first Genderqueer Pride Parade at Madurai. Shankar also introduced LGBTQIA courses in few schools and universities curricula. Shankar was also a young panelist to share chair in University Grants Commission of India (UGC) and Indian Council of Social Sciences Research (ICSSR) sponsored National Seminars in India, Shankar conducted more than 85 Seminars, Interactive sessions on Gender & Sexuality for 8000 students in Madurai. Shankar coined the regional Tamil terms for genderqueer people and wrote Maraikkappatta Pakkangal the first book on Gender-Variants in Tamil. In April 2015, Shankar was invited by Tiruchi Siva to witness the passing of historical Rights of Transgender Persons Bill, 2014 at Rajya Sabha upper house of the Parliament of India. For contributions as a gender minority to Hinduism, Shankar was presented "Young Hindu Award" by writer Aravindan Neelakandan, Joe D Cruz at 6th Hindu Spiritual Services Fair.

Shankar petitioned the case of Asian Games medalist Santhi Soundarajan who was stripped of her medal after a gender test to the State and Central Government. Shankar launched multiple complaints on behalf of athlete Santhi in National Commission for Scheduled Castes and National Human Rights Commission of India also initiated Justice For Santhi Campaign which was instrumental in fetching her a permanent posting as athletic coach in Tamil Nadu Sports Development Authority in December 2016.

Shankar was a speaker at WorldPride Madrid Summit 2017. Shankar shared chair with Federico Mayor Zaragoza Director-General of UNESCO, Myrna Cunningham of United Nations Permanent Forum on Indigenous Issues and Zanele Muholi (Artivist) for the historic MADRID SUMMIT DECLARATION.

The State Council of Educational Research and Training under Government of Tamil Nadu has called Shankar to give inputs on Sex, Gender and Sexuality studies for the 2017 New School Curriculum Development Committee of Tamil Nadu to include LGBTQIA+ community in school studies. Shankar was also part of the panel on Theological Reader on Gender & Sexuality for National Council of Churches in India.

Shankar is one of the founding members of Intersex Asia, it is the Asia's first collective forum for Intersex Individuals and organisations, the first state policy briefing on Intersex Human Rights was organised by Shankar in July 2019.

In 2020 Gopi was one of the leading petitioners in the Delhi High Court case (Abhijit Iyer Mitra & Ors v. UOI) to recognize non-heterosexual marriages, and same sex union under the Hindu Marriage Act.

Transgender activism
Shankar through Srishti Madurai helpline rescued several trans women from forced sex work and begging. Shankar also mentors the Transgender India forum India's first 24x7 holistic help and support discussion forum for intersex and transgender people, as well as their families.

Shankar and trans woman S. Swapna staged a protest in Madurai collectorate on 7 October 2013 demanding reservation and to permit alternate genders to appear for examinations conducted by TNPSC, UPSC, SSC and Bank Exams. Later, Swapna successfully moved the Madras High Court in 2013 seeking permission to write the TNPSC Group II exam as a ‘woman’ candidate.

As the south regional representative of National Council for Transgender Persons Gopi ensured justice for transgender persons on various civil and human rights related cases. Gopi ensured inheritance rights for Transgender people and invoked Transgender Persons (Protection of Rights) Act, 2019 along with The Protection of Children from Sexual Offences Act, Scheduled Caste and Scheduled Tribe (Prevention of Atrocities) Act, 1989 in several cases dealing with sexual abuse of gender non confirming children in the Southern states of India.

In March 2022, The Hindu newspaper reported that Shankar resigned from the post of the south regional representative of NCTP, citing bureaucratic harassment and insensitivity. The newspaper quoted Shankar saying that the ‘ceremonial’ position was not serving the needs of the transgender community.But later Shankar said to be not resign till the tenure is over and still continues as the statutory authority.

Death threats and attacks
In 2016, Shankar was sexually, verbally harassed and received death threats from a member of one of the political parties during Shankar's campaign, after which the Tamil Nadu Police assigned Shankar with three security officers whenever Shankar was out campaigning. Shankar also expressed dismay on homophobia and transphobia in Tamil Muslim community when the youth wing of the Indian National League, a Muslim party,  Calling LGBTQIA+ people as "cultural terrorists", the poster calls for the "death sentence under section 377" and warns of terror against the community as homosexuality is "against Tamil culture" was put up by a day after Orlando nightclub shooting in the United States.

In January 2022, Shankar was threatened by members of a certain political party (allegedly DMK) in Mamallapuram. In November 2022, Shankar was attacked by an unknown group of six people in New Delhi.The attackers first demanded money, and when they were refused, they abused and physically assaulted Shankar. This was the fifth instance of violence that Shankar suffered.

Protection for intersex people in India
In 2015 Shankar urged Indian parliament to include intersex people in bill protecting trans rights, Shankar also launched an official complaint to National Human Rights Commission of India to ban the forced sex selective surgeries on intersex infants also to ensure their fundamental constitutional rights in India for which the NHRC issued directions to the Secretary Union Health Ministry Government of India to respond to Shankar within eight weeks.

On 22 April 2019 the Madras High Court (Madurai Bench) passed a landmark judgment and issued direction to ban Sex-Selective Surgeries on Intersex Infants based on the works of Gopi Shankar, the Court took note of the issue of the rampant practice of compulsory sex reassignment surgeries performed on inter-sex infants and children. The Court also expressed its gratitude to Shankar, noting that Shankar's work has had been a "humbling and enlightening experience for the Court".

In September 2019 Gopi submitted an official report to the United Nations Convention on the Rights of Persons with Disabilities committee on LGBTQI community living with disabilities and the key focus of the report was on Intersex persons in India. In turn the CRPD committee delivered a strong recommendation to the Government of India.

In October 2020 the Delhi Commission For Protection of Child Rights appointed Gopi and Anjali Gopalan as two expert advisors for a case pertaining to Intersex Human Rights violations. Based on the recommendations of Gopi the DCPCR suggested the Delhi Government to ban unnecessary medical interventions on Intersex Infants and Children.

Awards and accolades
Shankar was also awarded the Diversity Leadership Award 2016 by the World HRD Congress and featured in ‘India’s 8 LGBT role models under 30’ by Gaysi for voicing intersex rights in India.Out Leadership recommended Gopi Shankar as one of the expert and openly advocating leaders on LGBT+ issues along with Indian Minister Arun Jaitley and human rights activist Anjali GopalanIndia Times listed Shankar as one of the 11 Human Rights Activists Whose Life Mission Is To Provide Others With A Dignified Life

 Children's Champion State Award 2022- The Delhi Commission for Protection of Child Rights (DCPCR).  
 Hero Awards (Community Hero 2021)- APCOM,Thailand.Asia Pacific Coalition on Male Sexual Health
 Global Innovator 2020 - Human Rights Campaign
 Chanakya Award 2018 - Vision India Foundation 
The Commonwealth Youth Worker Finalist 2016 - The Commonwealth Secretariat, London.
 Highly Commended Runner Queen's Young Leader 2017 - Queen Elizabeth Diamond Jubilee Trust, in partnership with Comic Relief and the Royal Commonwealth Society
 16 Inspiring LGBTQIA people in the World 2017 - Vagabomb,(ScoopWhoop Media)
 Youth of the Year 2016 - Neeya Naana, Star Vijay TV
 Great People of Great Madurai - Radio Mirchi Award 2016
 Young Hindu Award 2014 - Tamil Hindu Team, Chennai
 Star Speaker Award 2013 - PPK Show, Star Vijay TV
 Star Speaker Award 2012 - PPK Show, Star Vijay TV

Media
GOPI a Brazilian/English Documentary movie on Shankar's life directed by Viviane D'Avilla was premiered at Festival do Rio 2018 have won multiple awards.

Shankar appeared on Living Foodz Dakshin Diaries to curate the gender specific sacred spaces of Indigenous gender-variants of ancient India.

Singer Chinmayi produced a three part YouTube video series with Shankar to support Intersex Human Rights in Tamil Nadu.

Bibliography

Author
 Maraikappatta Pakkangal (Hidden Pages) Unedited Version, Illustrator Julian Wrangler, Germany, Srishti Madurai., 2014, .
 Maraikkappatta Pakkangal: Paal - Paalinam - Paaliyal Orunginaivu- Gopi Shankar (Edited Version), 296 Pages, Publisher: Kizhakku Pathippagam, 2017.

Contributor
 Definitions- Understanding Gender, Sex, and Sexuality. A Theological Reader on Human Sexuality and Gender Diversities: Envisioning Inclusivity - . Publisher: ISPCK and National Council of Churches in India (NCCI). 2017

 Biological basis of Bigender identity and its medical potential: Frontier Vistas in Modern Biotechnology- . Publisher: Department of Immunology & Microbiology, The American College, Madurai. 2013

See also 
 List of people with non-binary gender identities
 List of intersex people

References

External links 
 Gopi Shankar M Interview on Indian Women Blog
Gopi Shankar M on The history of Indigenous sex, gender minorities in India
Gopi Shankar M Interview on The Better India
Talk By Gopi Shankar Madurai on Gender Minorities of Ancient India, Transgender India
Justice For Santhi Campaign - The Huffington Post
The Many Genders of Old India- Gopi Shankar

Living people
1991 births
Bisexual rights activists
Dalit activists
Dalit writers
Dalit feminists
Dalit politicians
Indian non-binary people
Indian activist journalists
Indian civil rights activists
Indian children's rights activists
Indian columnists
Indian motivational speakers
Indigenous activists of Asia
Intersex non-binary people
Intersex rights in India
LGBT Hindus
Indian LGBT rights activists
Indian LGBT writers
Madurai Kamaraj University alumni
Mental health activists
Nonviolence advocates
People from Madurai
Tamil writers
Transgender rights activists
Sexual abuse victim advocates
Writers from Madurai
Intersex writers
Intersex academics
Intersex politicians
Non-binary writers
Non-binary activists
Non-binary politicians